The Esk–Hampton Road is a state highway in Queensland. It leaves the Brisbane Valley Highway at Esk and travels in a westerly direction for  until it reaches the New England Highway at Hampton, where it ends.

History

From a historical perspective the Esk–Hampton Road consists of three sections of approximately equal length. 

The eastern section, from Esk to the foothills of the Great Dividing Range, was developed along Redbank Creek (the watercourse) to provide access to stands of timber, and to a sawmill that was located at Redbank Creek (the locality). Subsequently, it serviced farms that were established on land cleared of most old-growth forest.

The western section, from Hampton to the end of a spur of the Great Dividing Range, was also developed to facilitate the harvesting of timber. Prior to European settlement the rich volcanic soil on the ridge supported a sub-tropical rainforest, which contained timbers that were in high demand, including red cedar, tallowwood and hoop pine. These timbers were used in some homes constructed in the area at the time. The road later provided access to cleared land that was used for dairying and beef cattle grazing. This section provides access to Ravensbourne National Park, which preserves a remnant of the rainforest.

The central (mountain) section was developed later, to enable more direct travel between the two districts. The road is now a popular tourist drive, particularly as part of a round trip from the Brisbane area to the Toowoomba district. It is rated as a "good ride" by motorcycling tourists.

The mountain section was completed in 1929.
One of the most difficult sections to complete was the Pryde's Pinch section which had a steep gradient and was not suitable for traffic until sometime after 1932.

Terrain

The Esk–Hampton Road climbs from an elevation of 117m at Esk to 719m at Hampton. Seven km of its length has an incline/grade of 5 to 10% and 1.4 km has an incline/grade greater than 10%.

Major intersections

See also

 Highways in Australia
 List of highways in Queensland
 List of highways numbered 85

References

Notes

Highways in Queensland
Buildings and structures in Somerset Region
Toowoomba Region